The Scandinavian coastal conifer forests or Norwegian coastal conifer forest is a Palearctic ecoregion in the temperate coniferous forests biome, located along the coast of Norway. Within it are a number of small areas with botanical features and a local climate consistent with a temperate rainforest.

Location and description 
The Scandinavian coastal conifer forest is a terrestrial ecoregion as defined by WWF and National Geographic. The broad definition is based on climatic parameters and includes a long area along the western Norwegian coast from Lindesnes and north to approximately Senja (further north summers are too cool for pine in coastal areas); in essence areas along the Norwegian coast where winters are fairly mild and where precipitation is sufficient and falls all year, usually with a peak in autumn and winter. It might include areas lacking naturally occurring conifer forests (as in Lofoten, where the pine forest was cleared by man many centuries ago) and even islands and rocky headlands with little or no woodland and forest, as well as areas with mostly deciduous forest (aspen, silver birch and downy birch, elm, rowan, sycamore maple, hazel).
The pine trees can be very old, up to 700 years in some areas in the north (hinnøya).

At somewhat higher elevations near the treeline in the Scandinavian Mountains is the Scandinavian montane birch forest and grasslands ecoregion. In some areas along valleys, this ecoregion meet the taiga of the inland belonging to the Scandinavian and Russian taiga ecoregion without mountain barriers. Examples of such valleys include the Rauma valley connecting Åndalsnes to Lesja and Dombås and the Namdalen valley connecting the Nord-Trøndelag coast to the cold interior with connection into Sweden. The ecoregion is naturally fragmented by fjords and mountains.

Oceanic climate 

This area has a growing season lasting 150–240 days (24-hr mean 5 °C threshold) and reliable precipitation, from 870 to 3,000 mm. July mean range from 12 at some islands in the north (Andenes, Røst) to 16 °C in sheltered fjords in the south (Kvamsøy). Average daily highs in July range from 14 to 20 °C. Winters are often rainy and sometimes snowy (especially in northern areas), January mean range from −2° to 3 °C with daytime highs from 0 to 5 °C. Mean annual temperature range from 8.5 °C in the south (Bømlo; Stavanger and Bergen at 8.4), 6-7 °C in central area (Kristiansund 7.2 °C, Brønnøy 6.6 °C) to 4-5 °C in the northernmost part (Bodø 5.5 °C Andenes 4.4 °C). This type of climate corresponds to Köppen type Cfb (Cfc for the northernmost islands). Temperatures and precipitation pattern are comparable to the coast of British Columbia from northern Vancouver Island and north through the Alaska Panhandle to Yakutat and Seward.

For the smaller area classified as rainforest, there is at least 200 days/year with measurable precipitation. The minimum annual precipitation given in the sources varies but are generally around 1.400 mm. Some of the wettest areas in this ecoregion get more than 3000 mm annually, such as Brekke (3495 mm) near the mouth of Sognefjord, and even some areas much further north (Lurøy 3066 mm at 115 m ASL).

Subregions and species
The lack of spruce north of the Arctic circle (Saltfjell) and along the southwestern coast is mainly due to barriers such as fjords and mountain ranges, and planted spruce grows well north of the arctic circle as in Tromsø.  The southern limit of the Norway Spruce habitat in Norway is limited by mountains and fjords blocking the way, and also because of winters being too mild for Norway spruce near the outer seaboard along the southwestern coast. Along the southwestern coast and fjords (Vestlandet or Western Norway) is a temperate mixed forest with pine, some yew and deciduous trees (betula pendula, wych elm, linden, oak, aspen, hazel, juniper) in the lowlands and more typical boreal forest at higher altitudes. Several species reach their northernmost extent in this ecoregion (naturally occurrence): Oak to Edøy and Ørland, yew to Molde, holly to Smøla, ash to Frosta, linden to Brønnøy, elm to Beiarn, hazel to Steigen, and pine has its northernmost forests in the world at Stabbursdalen National Park.

The botanically richest areas - the coast north to Ålesund and some patches further north along Trondheimsfjord), although less diverse than the Oslofjord area due to migration barriers like fjords and mountains - are considered boreonemoral. Some of the wettest areas in this region, where annual rainfall exceed 2,000 mm or even 3,00 mm, are sometimes considered boreonemoral rainforest.

Introduced species

Introduced species include the Norway spruce, which has been planted for economic reasons in areas outside the natural range both on the southwestern coast and in the northernmost part of the ecoregion. Sitka spruce has also been planted extensively, especially near the outer seaboard, even north to Vesterålen and Harstad.

Sycamore maple was introduced to private gardens and church yards more than 150 years ago, and has spread profusely along the southwestern coast, along the central coast (Trøndelag) and, to a considerably lesser degree, north to Vesterålen. It is still most common near cities and villages, but seems certain to continue expansion along the coast and fjords.

There are many smaller introduced plants spreading, such as rosa rugosa. However, due to the often steep terrain, forestry has been somewhat limited in the coastal area, and many areas with original vegetation remain, but are often fragmented, especially so in the southern part of the ecoregion. American mink, originally escaped from fur farms, have colonized the whole country, and threaten sea bird colonies in some areas, but have not reached the outermost islands such as Røst, which have the largest sea bird colonies. The native otter seem to be dominant in areas with competition.

Boreal rainforest
Within this long area is a smaller area classified as boreal rainforest based on botanical criteria. Much of the original forests have been destroyed, but a total of 250 forested areas, most of them not very large, have been classified as boreal rainforest. They are located from 63°20'N in Snillfjord in Sør-Trøndelag county and north along the coast to 66°N in Rana in Nordland county, but restricted to areas with high humidity; often shielded from the sun most of the day. Some inland locations are included; these are located in moist locations, often near waterfalls. This is the main area in Europe for boreal rainforest and Norway thus has a special responsibility for preservation. This coastal forest is mostly found at the lower elevations (below 200 m).

Botanical criteria for boreal rainforest 

Due to the long history of human settlement (millennia) with agriculture and more recently forestry management, only fragments remain of the original forest. The boreal rainforests are made up mostly of Norway Spruce (Picea abies) but also included deciduous trees. Common Juniper (Juniperus communis) is also common. There is a rich understory of mosses and ferns. However, the most distinguishing feature is the diversity of lichens, some of which are endemic for this forest, or have their only location in Europe here (they are often found on the northwest coast of North America). Approximately 15 of the most rare or typical species of lichens have been named Trøndelagselementet (named after the Trøndelag region). Pseudocyphella crocata, Pannaria ahlneri and Erioderma padicellatum and Lobaria halli are examples of lichens. More than 60 unique species of lichen and moss can be found in the area.

There are two subtypes of this rainforest; the Namdalen type and the Brønnøy/Fosen type. There are also broadleaf trees scattered in this forest, especially in the Brønnøy/Fosen type. Broadleaf trees include birch (Silver Birch Betula pendula and Downy Birch Betula pubescens), European Rowan (Sorbus aucuparia), Aspen (Populus tremula), Goat Willow (Salix caprea), and Grey Alder (Alnus incana). Rarer species are Wych Elm (Ulmus glabra), Common Hazel (Corylus avellana) and Black Alder (Alnus glutinosa) (the latter only in the southern part of the area).

Fauna 

There are a large number of species of migrating birds in this ecoregion, as well as some that stay all year. Larger herbivore animals are moose and red deer (the latter only south of the Arctic circle), as well as the smaller roe deer. Reindeer might occasionally come down to the coast north of Trondheimsfjord, but they usually stay at the highlands outside this ecoregion. Predators are few, as they have been hunted by man for centuries, exterminating brown bear and grey wolf in the coastal area. In some areas, they roam further inland in the taiga ecoregion, and might on rare occasions get closer to the coast. Red fox and the sea eagle are common predators in the area, the latter now being very common after decades of protection. There are also some lynx, mostly in the northern part. Hares, otters are common and one can even see european beavers although more rarely. There are also some amphibians including the common frog and the smooth newt; the european viper can be seen south of the Arctic circle.

See also 
List of ecoregions in Europe
Scandinavian montane birch forest and grasslands
Scandinavian and Russian taiga
Sarmatic mixed forests
Vegetation of Norway
Temperate coniferous forests

Gallery

Photographs

External links 
Abstract descripting article about lichens in Norwegian coastal rainforest
Image
Image - lichens

References 

Temperate coniferous forests
Ecoregions of Europe
Ecoregions of Norway
Forests and woodlands of Norway
Forests of Norway
Geography of Scandinavia
Scandinavia
Palearctic ecoregions